Arnau Martínez López (born 25 April 2003) is a Spanish footballer who plays for Girona FC. Mainly a central defender, he can also play as a right back.

Club career
Born in Premià de Dalt, Barcelona, Catalonia, Martínez joined FC Barcelona's La Masia in 2010, after playing for CE Premià de Dalt. He left the club in 2016, and represented CE L'Hospitalet before moving to Girona FC in September 2018.

On 29 November 2020, after renewing his contract until 2023, Martínez made his senior debut with the reserves, starting in a 2–2 Tercera División away draw against UE Sant Andreu. He made his first team debut on 17 December, coming on as a second-half substitute for Enric Franquesa in a 2–0 away win against Gimnástica Segoviana CF, for the season's Copa del Rey.

Martínez made his professional debut on 7 January 2021, again replacing Franquesa in a 2–1 home win against CD Lugo, also for the national cup. His Segunda División debut occurred on 28 March, as he started in a 2–1 home success over Albacete Balompié.

Martínez subsequently established himself as a starter, and scored his first professional goal on 9 May 2021 by netting the opener in a 4–1 away routing of UD Logroñés; aged 18 years and 14 days, he became the youngest goalscorer of the club's history.

References

External links
 Profile at the Girona FC website
 
 
 
 

2003 births
Living people
People from Maresme
Sportspeople from the Province of Barcelona
Spanish footballers
Footballers from Catalonia
Association football defenders
La Liga players
Segunda División players
Tercera División players
Girona FC B players
Girona FC players
Spain youth international footballers
Spain under-21 international footballers
Catalonia international footballers